Hortus Animae is a progressive black metal band from Northern and Central Italy. They formed in 1997 in the town of Rimini (Romagna). After the release of their self-produced debut The Melting Idols, they began an active live streak with bands like Lacuna Coil, Ancient, and Napalm Death. Upon opening for the cult Norwegian black metal band Ancient in Padova (Italy), the band developed a friendship with their drummer Grom, who soon after joined the band out of admiration for their work and made it his primary side-project. At this point, the band began the recording process of their second album and first official release Waltzing Mephisto which had been years in the writing. The album was recorded at the well-known Italian metal studio Fear. Following the recording, the band signed a deal with Greek label Black Lotus Records in October 2002 and subsequently with Sleaszy Rider Records (EMI) for their 3rd and most evolved concept album The Blow Of Furious Winds in May 2005.

Immediately following their 1998 demo cassette 'An Abode For Spirit And Flesh', they quickly developed a wide and strong following in the underground and gained attention from the specialized press with few reviews hitting lower than the 'excellent' mark. 

The band has since achieved cult status within the extreme metal underground, partly due to their secretive live appearances, but mainly due to their unique and eclectic blend of styles & cover songs. Their music drew from 1970s progressive rock, gothic, classical and ambient... All blended with their original form of death/black metal. They incorporated instruments such as piano, viola, violin, mandolin, synth, and very diverse vocal styles into their music. This was rare and uncommon during those years. Drummer GROM's following with his other notable acts (Doomsword, Ancient...) is most likely another reason.

Hortus Animae is well-known within the genre for its unique and eclectic cover songs. The official debut Waltzing Mephisto contained a cover of the black metal anthem "Freezing Moon" (Mayhem) blended with Mike Oldfield's "Tubular Bells (The Exorcist)" and Italian 1970s prog band Il Balletto Di Bronzo's "Terzo Incontro", highlighting the band's inspiration with 1970s dark progressive rock music. This song is still considered to this day as one of the most appreciated covers in the extreme metal underground. Their following epic album The Blow Of Furious Winds contained yet another 1970s prog rock cover. A diverse and original mold of Queen's "The Fairy Feller's Masterstroke" & "Nevermore".

In between the 2 albums, the band appeared with another 'now cult' cover song on the Black Lotus Records' release The Lotus Eaters: Tribute to Dead Can Dance. Hortus Animae recorded their metalized epic interpretation of "Windfall" & "Summoning Of The Muse" featuring a joint effort with gothic singer Liv Kristine (Theatre Of Tragedy, Leave's Eyes, Atrocity) on lead vocals.

Hortus Animae has been proclaimed 'best emerging band' and 'best Italian album of the year' in the polls of the top Italian magazine Metal Maniac in 2005.

The group disbanded on 18 January 2006.
They posted this message on their homepage of their website:

"Due to different motivations the band decided to split-up or, at least, to stay on-hold for some time. There are technical and personal reasons involved (the music business, hardships... life itself) which led us to take this decision. We faced many difficulties in the music industry, but we wish to thank and hail all the fans and people who bought our albums, visited our websites, came to our shows, wrote to us, believed in what we did or just listened to our music. We also want to thank the worldwide metal press for their support. We may return in the future, but for now we just don't know."

Years after their split they released a 10th-anniversary commemorative boxset (sold out) called 'Funeral Nation: 10 years of Hortus Animae' through Sleaszy Rider Records (EMI distribution). The boxset contained various gadgets (T-shirt, mug, pin, etc.) as well as their first 2 official albums Waltzing Mephisto (in an unreleased demo version) & The Blow Of Furious Winds, and a 'Making of...' DVD.

After 4 years of the box set release and sell-out, increasing requests and popularity in the underground demanded a further re-release of the band's historical discography. Hortus Animae teamed up with Thrash Corner Records (USA) to release their definitive collection in 2012, aptly called 'Funeral Nation MMXII' their definitive collection. Released worldwide in a double CD edition with new artwork, this collection featured the very first self-produced album The Melting Idols, which had not been included in the previous box set.

The band has also launched a new Myspace page for the occasion: http://www.myspace.com/hortusanimae

On 25 January 2013, the band officially stated that the time was ripe for their comeback, and they are hard at work with their new album, which currently has the working title At the End of Doomsday and will be recorded at Domination Studio (RSM) under the guiding light of the renowned producer and sound engineer Simone Mularoni (DGM, empYrios), which now is also the band's session bass player. Recent communications have set the definitive title of the reunion album to Secular Music, due out in 2014.

Members

Current members
Martyr Lucifer - Bass (1997-2005), Vocals (1997-2006, 2013–present)
 Gianluca "Hypnos" Bacchilega - Guitars (1998-2006, 2013–present)
Bless - Keyboards, Vocals (backing) (1998-2006), Keyboards (2013-present)
Diego "Grom" Meraviglia - Drums (2002-2006, 2013–present)
Adamant - Bass (2014–present)
Manuel "MG Desmadre" Guerrieri- Guitars (2014–present)

Former members
 Lorenzo Bartolini - guitars, keyboards (1997–1999)
 Thomas Ghirardelli - drums, backing vocals (1997–2001)
 Claudio Caselli - guitars, backing vocals (1997-1998)
 Eleonora Valmaggi - keyboards, violin, female vocals (1997-2000)
 Marco "Karnal" Righetti - guitars (2000), bass (2006)
 Claudio "Iarsa" Nicoletti - guitars (2001-2002)
 Massimo "Arke" Arcucci - guitars (2002)
 Fabio "Amon 418" Bartolini - guitars, synth (2004-2006)
 Ecnerual - violin (2014-2015)

Session Members
 Scorpios - session guitars (1998)
 Vallo - session drums (2002)
 Moonbeam - session violin (2003, 2005)
 Claudio Tirincanti - session drums (2005-2006)

Timeline

Discography
 An Abode for Spirit and Flesh (demo tape 1998)
 The Melting Idols (self produced CD, 2000)
 Waltzing Mephisto (Black Lotus Records CD, 2003)
 Windfall Introducing Summoning of the Muse (CDs Promo 2004)
 The Blow of Furious Winds (Sleaszy Rider Records / EMI, 2005)
 Funeral Nation / 10 Years Of Hortus Animae (Sleaszy Rider Records, 2008)
 Funeral Nation MMXII (Thrash Corner Records, 2012)
 Secular Music (Flicknife Records, 2014)
 Godless Years (Satanica Productions, 2014)
 There's No Sanctuary (Azermedoth Rocords / BlackHeavens Music, 2016)

References & Press
Review No. 1
Review No. 2 (Italian)
Review No. 3 (Italian)
Review No. 4
Review#5

External links
Official site
More information on the band

Italian black metal musical groups
Italian progressive metal musical groups
Musical groups established in 1997
Musical groups disestablished in 2007